Per Svensson may refer to:

Per Svensson (actor) (born 1965), Swedish actor
Per Svensson (ice hockey) (born 1988), Swedish ice hockey defenceman
Per-Olof Svensson (born 1942), Swedish politician
Per Oskar Svensson, a.k.a. Pelle Svensson (born 1943), Swedish Greco-Roman wrestling and Olympic silver medalist